Cryptopsy is the seventh studio album by Canadian technical death metal band Cryptopsy. It was released on September 14, 2012.

Track listing

Personnel

Cryptopsy
Matt McGachy – vocals
Jon Levasseur – lead guitar
Christian Donaldson – rhythm guitar
Olivier Pinard – bass
Flo Mounier – drums

Production
Jef Fortin – mastering
Christian Donaldson – production, engineering, mixing
Anthony Dubois – photography
Mircea Gabriel Eftemie – cover art, artwork, design

References

2012 albums
Cryptopsy albums